Rose's Law is the observation that the number of quibits on chips doubles about every 18 months. It is the quantum computing equivalent of Moore's Law.

The term was coined by Steve Jurvetson when he met Geordie Rose, the founder of D-Wave Systems and the law's namesake.

References 

Rules of thumb
Quantum computing